Nicholas Purslow (by 1533 – 8 August 1563), of the Inner Temple, London, was an English politician.

Career
He was a Member (MP) of the Parliament of England for Appleby in 1558 and for Morpeth in 1559.

Death
He made his will on 5 July 1563, and died on 8 August. He was survived by his wife, Margaret, née Williams.

References

1563 deaths
Members of the Inner Temple
English MPs 1558
English MPs 1559
Members of Parliament for Appleby
Members of Parliament for Morpeth
16th-century English politicians
Year of birth uncertain